Raffa may refer to:
 Raffa, Syria a village in Al-Tamanah Nahiyah, Maarrat al-Nu'man District, Idlib
 Raffa (boules), a specialty, both male and female, of boules

People with the surname
 György Raffa, Hungarian ice hockey player
 Jessica Raffa, Australian ballroom dancer
 Nancy Raffa, American ballet mistress

See also 
 Ouled Rafaa, Algeria
 Rafa (disambiguation)